Volume Three, Volume 3 or Volume III may refer to:

Music

Albums
 Volume 3 (She & Him album), 2013
 Vol. 3... Life and Times of S. Carter, a 1999 album by Jay-Z
 Volume 3: A Child's Guide to Good and Evil, a 1968 album by The West Coast Pop Art Experimental Band
 Volume 3: The Kids Have Eyes
 Volume 3: Further in Time, a 2001 album by Afro Celt Sound System
 Volume 3 (Easybeats album), 1966
 Volume 3 (Fabrizio De André album)
 Volume III: The Silence of Animals, a 2003 album by Two-Minute Miracles
 Volume III (Kamchatka album)
 Vol. 3: (The Subliminal Verses), a 2004 album by Slipknot
 Volume Three, a 1992 album published by Volume
 Traveling Wilburys Vol. 3
 Volume III (September Mourning EP), a 2019 EP by heavy metal band September Mourning

Songs
 "Volume III" (song), a 1981 song by Stars on 45

See also
 Three-volume